Murrieta Creek runs  southeasterly through southwestern Riverside County, California, United States, through the cities of Wildomar, Murrieta, and Temecula, ending  southeast of the city center of Temecula, where it has its confluence with Temecula Creek and forms the head of the Santa Margarita River.

History
The creek and town of Murrieta are not named for the bandit, Joaquin Murrieta, but for the pioneer sheep ranchers, Izaquel and Juan Murrieta, who purchased the Rancho Pauba and Rancho Temecula Mexican land grants. His brother returned to Spain, but Juan brought 100,000 sheep to the valley in 1873, using the meadows to feed his herd.

Watershed and course
The creek has several minor tributaries, including flows from Lake Skinner whose outlet is Tucalota Creek below the reservoir, which then flows to Santa Gertrudis Creek, then Murrieta Creek.

References

Rivers of Riverside County, California
Murrieta, California
Temecula, California
Wildomar, California
Rivers of Southern California